Bredon Barn is a large 14th-century threshing  barn located at Bredon, Worcestershire, England, standing close to the River Avon.

It has a steep pitched roof covered in Cotswold limestone tiles. The interior of the barn is divided into 9 bays by oak posts on stone plinths forming aisles, and carrying the open timber roof.

It was badly damaged by fire in 1979, but was fully restored in 1983.  It is a Scheduled monument and Grade I listed building owned by the National Trust.

References

External links
National Trust - Bredon Barn

Buildings and structures completed in the 14th century
National Trust properties in Worcestershire
Barns in England